Zboriv Raion was a raion in Ternopil Oblast in western Ukraine. Its administrative center was Zboriv. The raion was abolished on 18 July 2020 as part of the administrative reform of Ukraine, which reduced the number of raions of Ternopil Oblast to three. The area of Zboriv Raion was merged into Ternopil Raion. The last estimate of the raion population was 

At the time of disestablishment, the raion consisted of three hromadas:
 Ozerna rural hromada with the administration in the selo of Ozerna;
 Zaliztsi settlement hromada with the administration in the urban-type settlement of Zaliztsi;
 Zboriv urban hromada with the administration in Zboriv.
Part of the raion was merged with the city of Ternopil, into Ternopil urban hromada.

Local government — Zboriv District State Administration.

Notes

See also
 Subdivisions of Ukraine

Former raions of Ternopil Oblast
1939 establishments in Ukraine
Ukrainian raions abolished during the 2020 administrative reform